Shamil Gitinov (born 4 July 1979) is a retired Armenian Freestyle wrestler of Avar descent. He won a silver medal in 2006 and a bronze medal in 2007 at the European Wrestling Championships.

References

1989 births
Living people
Sportspeople from Makhachkala
Armenian male sport wrestlers
European Wrestling Championships medalists